Harri Deaves (born 13 June 2001) is a Welsh rugby union player, currently playing for United Rugby Championship side Ospreys. His preferred position is flanker.

Ospreys
Deaves was named in the Ospreys academy squad ahead of the 2021–22 season. He made his debut in Round 4 of the 2021–22 European Rugby Champions Cup in the match against .

References

External links
itsrugby profile

Living people
Welsh rugby union players
Ospreys (rugby union) players
Rugby union flankers
2001 births